British mountains, mountains and hills of the British Isles
 British Mountains, Yukon, mountain range in Yukon Territory, Canada